Jorge Thielen Armand (born 1990, in Caracas, Venezuela) is a film director, screenwriter and producer. He studied Communications in Concordia University in Montreal, and later, with Rodrigo Michelangeli, founded the Canadian-Venezuelan film production company La Faena Films. He has directed two feature films, La Soledad and La Fortaleza, and the short film Flor de la Mar. All three films have received positive reviews from critics.

Biography 
Armand's first feature film, La Soledad (English: The Solitude), premiered in the 73º Venice International Film Festival receiving the Jury Prize in Biarritz and the Audience Award for Best Film in the Miami Film Festival, followed by other accolades around the world.

His second feature film, La Fortaleza (English: Fortitude), premiered in the Tiger Competition of the International Film Festival Rotterdam and has been screened in international film festivals, including Busan, Cairo, Guadalajara, Gijon, amongst others. He was again awarded the Jury Prize in Biarritz, and received additional awards in Rome and Caracas.

In 2021, Armand received the Guggenheim Foundation Fellowship, becoming the first Venezuelan filmmaker to obtain this recognition.

In 2022, Armand participated at the Rockefeller Foundation Bellagio Residency with a new project entitled La Muerte No Tiene Dueño.

Filmography

References

External links 
 

Venezuelan film directors
Venezuelan film producers
1990 births
Living people